The W. S. Cox Plate is a Group 1 Thoroughbred horse race for horses aged three years old and over under Weight for age conditions, over a distance of 2040 metres (approximately 1m 2f), that is held by the Moonee Valley Racing Club at Moonee Valley Racecourse, Melbourne, Australia in late October. The race has a purse of A$5,000,000.

History
The race is named in honour of William Samuel (W. S.) Cox, the racing club's founder.

It was first run on Saturday 28 October 1922 with a purse of £1,000.

Between 1999–2005 the event was included in the Emirates World Series Racing Championship, a global "grand prix" of horse racing. The series included the King George VI and Queen Elizabeth Stakes at Ascot, the Japan Cup, the Dubai World Cup, the Arlington Million, the Hong Kong Cup, the Canadian International Stakes, the Grosser Preis von Baden, the Irish Champion Stakes, the Breeders' Cup Turf and the Breeders' Cup Classic.

1938 & 1948 racebooks

Notable winners
Past winners of the Cox Plate include many of the champion racehorses of Australia and New Zealand. Winx has been the most successful, winning four years in a row (2015-2018) and Kingston Town won the race three times. Many horses have won the race twice, including Phar Lap, Flight, Tobin Bronze, Sunline, Northerly, Fields of Omagh, and So You Think.

Only one horse has ever won the race in the same year as winning the Melbourne and Caulfield cups, Rising Fast (1954), considered by many to be the greatest-ever horse from New Zealand.

The double with the Melbourne Cup has only been achieved by seven horses: Makybe Diva, Might and Power, Saintly, Nightmarch, Phar Lap, Delta and Rising Fast.

Only three horses have ever won the Melbourne Cup and then gone on to win the Cox Plate the following year: Phar Lap, Might and Power and Makybe Diva.

The first Cox Plate was run in 1922 and won by the English horse Violoncello, who also won his next three starts during the Melbourne Spring Racing Carnival.

The 1925 race was taken out by three-year-old Manfred, who went on to win the VRC Derby and ran second to Windbag in the Melbourne Cup.

The class gallopers Heroic (21 wins from 51 races) and Amounis (33 wins from 78 races) were successful in 1926 and 1927.

Champion New Zealand-bred Nightmarch won in 1929 before Phar Lap took out the race in 1930 and 1931. Another dual winner of the race was Chatham in 1932 and 1934, as was Young Idea in 1936 and 1937.

The 1938 race was won by Ajax (36 wins from 46 races) in race record time. Outstanding New Zealand champion Beau Vite, a winner of 31 races, won in 1940 and 1941.

Due to restrictions on interstate travel due to World War II, the race was only contested by local horses from 1942 to 1944.

In 1946, the Cox Plate was run in two divisions with the mare Flight winning the stronger division. She became a dual winner following her victory a year earlier. Hydrogen became the seventh dual winner of the race with victories in 1952 and 1953. The dual Caulfield Cup and Melbourne Cup winner Rising Fast won in 1954. Redcraze, a 32-race winner and New Zealand champion, took out the Plate in 1957 as a seven-year-old, ridden by George Moore. Noholme took nearly a second off the race record in a front-running display to win in 1959.

Tulloch, who is often compared to Phar Lap and Carbine, won the following year and again set a new race record. Tobin Bronze became a dual winner of the race with victories in 1966 and 1967. The 1969 Cox Plate was won by the New Zealand three-year-old colt Daryl's Joy, who went on to race successfully in the USA. The popular Goondiwindi grey, Gunsynd, was trainer Tommy Smith's third winner of the Cox Plate in 1972, and the New Zealand Derby winner Fury's Order staggered to victory on a bog track in 1975. Surround became the first three-year-old filly to win the race in 1976, when she defeated the VRC Derby winner Unaware.

The ill-fated Dulcify strode away to win by seven lengths in 1979. He later started favourite in the Melbourne Cup but had to be put down after breaking a pelvis during the race. One of only two triple winners of the Cox Plate, Kingston Town, won in 1980, 1981 and 1982. On each occasion he was ridden by a different jockey: Malcolm Johnston in 1980, Ron Quinton in 1981, and Peter Cook in 1982. After winning in 1983, Strawberry Road raced in Europe and the US, where he ran fifth in the Prix de l'Arc de Triomphe at Longchamp and third to Seattle Song in the 1984 Washington, D.C. International at Laurel. In 1984, Red Anchor became trainer T.J. Smith's seventh Cox Plate winner. The 1986 Cox Plate was a two-horse war over the final 800 metres before Bonecrusher triumphed over Our Waverley Star by a neck. This encounter became known as the Race of the Century.

Rubiton, the winner in 1987, went on to a successful stud career where he sired a future Cox Plate winner in Fields of Omagh. Better Loosen Up was 30 lengths from the lead, with 1000 metres to run, before winning the 1990 Plate in record time. He later became the first – and remains the only – Australian horse to win the Japan Cup. The eight-year-old Super Impose won in 1992 and defeated a top-class field which included Better Loosen Up, Let's Elope and favourite Naturalism, who lost his rider. Naturalism went on to run second in the Japan Cup. Australian Horse of the Year Octagonal defeated Mahogany in 1995, while Saintly gave Bart Cummings his second winner of the race in 1996 and Dane Ripper his third winner the following year. The 'People's Champion' Might and Power led throughout to win in 1998, setting a new track record not to be broken for 17 years.

In a front-running display, Sunline won the 1999 Cox Plate and returned in 2000 to win again by seven lengths (equalling Dulcify's winning margin), before West Australian champion Northerly defeated her in 2001 and 2002. In 2004, Savabeel became the first 3-year-old to win since Octagonal. In 2005, Makybe Diva triumphed and became one of the most popular horses in Australian racing history with an unprecedented third Melbourne Cup win 10 days later.

Fields of Omagh won his second Cox Plate in 2006, having already won in 2003, then finished second in 2004 and third behind Makybe Diva in 2005. In 2007, El Segundo won the Cox Plate, avenging his close defeat to Fields of Omagh the year before. In 2008, Maldivian led all the way to claim victory, while So You Think, at just his fifth career start, was an easy winner in 2009, giving Bart Cummings his fourth training victory in the race.

In 2013, Shamus Award recorded his first career win in the Cox Plate, a unique achievement for a WFA race of such high standing. He gained a start only due to the scratching of dominant favourite Atlantic Jewel.

Winx won in 2015 as a 4-year-old mare and in doing so set a new track record. She returned in 2016 when the race boasted a stellar field including the high class Godolphin star Hartnell. Winx and Hartnell looked set for a dream showdown approaching the home bend before Hugh Bowman flicked the switch on Winx, who accelerated away to score by a record breaking margin of eight lengths. In 2017, the champion mare started the Cox Plate as the shortest priced favourite since Phar Lap at $1.10 aiming for her 22nd successive win. After receiving a scare down the straight in the final 200m from Humidor, Winx pulled off an incredible victory to join Kingston Town in becoming just the second triple winner of the title. Winx completed the course in a time of 2 min 2.94 and in doing so broke the track record she previously set in 2015. In 2018 Winx launched herself into true equine legend status winning an unprecedented fourth Cox Plate.

Past winners
For a list of Cox Plate winning horses, see List of Cox Plate winners.

Favourites record
The favourite in the Cox Plate has an overall win rate of 41%. Favourites starting at less than $2.00 (Even money – 1/1) have a win rate of 70%. Phar Lap has the record of shortest favourite at $1.07 (1/14 on) in 1931. More recently Winx started favourite at $1.10 (1/10 on) in 2017 on her way to winning her record-equalling third Cox Plate and in 2018 at her record-breaking fourth win she started at 1.20.

 Price: * indicates equal favourite.

Attendance
2021 – 0 (no public attendance due to COVID-19 pandemic restrictions)
2020 – 0 (no public attendance due to COVID-19 pandemic restrictions)

2019 – 24,648
2018 – 38,035
2017 – 32,617
2016 – 26,000
2015 – 27,620
2014 – 28,216
2013 – 30,986
2011 – 30,000
2010 – 31,546
2009 – 31,000
2008 – 34,000
2007 – 34,561
2006 – 34,256
2005 – 44,189
2004 – 32,187
2003 – 30,109

See also
 Australian horse-racing
 List of Australian Group races
 Group races
 Melbourne Spring Racing Carnival

References

External links 
Moonee Valley Racing Club
coxplate.racingandsports.com.au (Official)

Open middle distance horse races
Group 1 stakes races in Australia
Sport in Melbourne